Dirty is a hip hop duo from Montgomery, Alabama, composed of cousins Big Pimp (Daniel Thomas, born 1978) and Mr. G Stacka The Gangsta (Tarvares Webster, born 1981). Their most popular album, Keep It Pimp & Gangsta peaked at number thirteen on the Top R&B/Hip-Hop Albums chart and number 63 on the Billboard 200.

Biography
The first major rap artists out of Alabama, they released their debut album, Country Versatile in 1999. After their second album sold well regionally, they signed with Universal Records, who re-released The Pimp & da Gangsta nationally in 2001. Their second album for Universal was 2002s Keep It Pimp & Gangsta. By this time, they signed to James Prince's label Rap-A-Lot Records and started their own label, as well, entitled, Blackklown. In 2003, they released their next album, Love Us or Hate Us, on Rap-A-Lot Records. In 2007, the group decided to leave the label, on good terms.

Discography

References

American hip hop groups
Southern hip hop groups
Musical groups from Alabama
Musicians from Montgomery, Alabama
Gangsta rap groups
Rappers from Alabama